Osakeyhtiö ("stock company"), often abbreviated to Oy, is the term for a Finnish limited company (e.g., Ltd, LLC, or GmbH). The Swedish-language term is aktiebolag, often abbreviated (in Finland) to Ab. The Swedish abbreviation is sometimes included, as in Ab Company Oy, Oy Company Ab, or Company Oy Ab. The abbreviations have been styled in many ways, such as Oy, OY, O.Y., or even O/Y. The English form is Ltd.

Julkinen osakeyhtiö
Julkinen osakeyhtiö (pl. julkiset osakeyhtiöt) means "public stock company" and is abbreviated to oyj. A julkinen osakeyhtiö can be listed on the Helsinki Stock Exchange. The term's Swedish equivalent is Abp (publikt aktiebolag). An oyj may be called a public limited company or public company in English and may use the abbreviation PLC or the term corporation in the company's English name, for example Remedy Entertainment Plc, Kone Corporation and Nokia Corporation.

Related types of Finnish companies 
 Avoin yhtiö, ay, general partnership
 Kommandiittiyhtiö, abbreviated ky, limited partnership

See also

List of companies of Finland

References

External links 
A 19th century history of the limited liability company in Finland 

Economy of Finland
Types of business entity

sv:Osakeyhtiö